Stairway was an English new-age music band, who have released a total of five albums and cassette tapes between 1986 and 1995.

History 
After The Yardbirds' mid-1980s reunion project (known as "Box of Frogs"), drummer Jim McCarty reunited with bassist Louis Cennamo (a colleague from McCarty's days with his post-Yardbirds bands, Renaissance and Illusion), to form "Stairway", a duo which would record largely instrumental and "atmospheric" music. In a departure from their usual roles in bands, for this project McCarty played keyboards and Cennamo (who is credited on Stairway releases as "Loui") played guitar.

Stairway was signed with Colin Wilcox of New World Cassettes, a UK-based independent record label that specialized in "healing music". Their first releases were two cassette tape albums: Aquamarine (1987) and Moonstone (1988), a mixture of songs and instrumentals. Additional musicians on these releases included keyboardist Clifford White, and another colleague from Renaissance and Illusion, vocalist Jane Relf. Although only available as cassette tapes initially, Stairway’s "New World Cassettes" albums were eventually both released in Compact Disc format.

These releases were subsequently followed by two albums with the Psychologist  and "Spiritual Healer", Malcolm Stern: Chakra Dance (1989) and Medicine Dance (1992), which they promoted through a few live performances, mainly at St James's Church, Piccadilly (London)

After a few years between releases, Stairway resurfaced once more as "James McCarty/Louis Cennamo" on Canadian flute player Ron Korb’s Oasis label, releasing the Raindreaming CD in 1995.

There have been no new releases by Stairway since 1995. McCarty has more recently been active with a re-formed version of The Yardbirds, and Cennamo has returned to playing bass and doing sessions, in addition to having begun a writing career. In 2015, Angel Air Records released a Stairway "best of" compilation, titled "Pearls Of The Deep".

Discography 
 Aquamarine (1987) ¤
 Moonstone (1988) ¤
 Chakra Dance (1989)
 Medicine Dance (1992)
 Raindreaming (1995)

¤ Note: These two releases were initially available as cassette tapes only. A CD that included tracks from both tapes was later released as Aquamarine.

Personnel 
 Louis Cennamo – guitar
 Jim McCarty – keyboards
 Jane Relf – vocals
 Clifford White – keyboards
 Dave Balen – Percussion and tablas on Medicine Dance

References

External links 
Stairway – Discographie – Stairway's Discography (French)
You are being redirected... – Stairway albums
Northern Lights – The Renaissance Fan Site – An Interview with Jim McCarty
Afterwards – The Yardbirds offshoots

Musical groups established in 1969
The Yardbirds members
English progressive rock groups